Paull is a village and civil parish in the East Riding of Yorkshire, England.

Paull may refer to:

People

People with the surname
Andy Paull (1892–1959), Squamish leader from British Columbia, Canada
Edith Helen Paull (1902–1975), Indian medical nurse
E. T. Paull (1858–1924), American musician
Gilbert Paull (1896–1983), British judge
James Paull (1901–1983), American lawyer and politician
James Paull (judge) (1818–1875), American lawyer, politician and judge
James Paull (MP) (1770–1808), British politician
Jennifer Paull (born 1944), English musician, publisher, lecturer, and author
Laline Paull, British novelist
Lawrence G. Paull (1938–2019), American movie production designer and art director
Morgan Paull (1944–2012), American actor
Nicki Paull, Australian actor

People with the given name
Paull Shin (1935–2021), Korean–American politician
Ricky Paull Goldin (born 1968), American actor

See also
Paul (disambiguation)
Paulls Valley, Western Australia
Alfred Paull House, a historic house in Taunton, Massachusetts, U.S.
Fort Paull, gun battery near the village of Paull